The Traveler was an automobile built by the Traveler Motor Car Co of Detroit, Michigan in 1914–15.

Model 36 used a 4-cylinder 3.6L L-head engine.  It had a 3-cylinder transmission and a 10 ft wheel base.  A 2-seater roadster sold for $1,275 with a 5-seater version at $20 more.

Model 48 had a 6-cylinder 5.6L engine.  This model was available in a two-seater and five-seater versions, with a wheel base of 10 ft, 10 in.  The five-seater sold for as high as $2,000.

References
 

Defunct motor vehicle manufacturers of the United States
Motor vehicle manufacturers based in Michigan
Defunct manufacturing companies based in Detroit